The 1878 South Northumberland by-election was fought on 17 April 1878.  The byelection was fought due to the succession to a peerage of the incumbent Conservative MP, Lord Eslington.  It was won by the Conservative candidate Edward Ridley.

 

 The original count for this by-election had both candidates receiving 2,912 votes.

References

1878 elections in the United Kingdom
1878 in England
19th century in Northumberland
By-elections to the Parliament of the United Kingdom in Northumberland constituencies